Linster is a surname that may refer to:

Charles Linster, first person to set a Guinness World Record for push ups
Christiane Linster, Luxembourg-born behavioral neuroscientist and professor 
Léa Linster (born 1955), Luxembourgian chef 
Wes Linster, fossil hunter who discovered the Bambiraptor skeleton